

 

Immodest Acts: The Life of a Lesbian Nun in Renaissance Italy is a history by Judith C. Brown; it was published in 1985 by Oxford University Press in hardback and the following year in paperback.

About
The book is a study of the life of Sister Benedetta Carlini, a 17th-century Italian nun who was accused of lesbianism and other "immodest acts". The book explores the cultural, social, and religious context of the time and the consequences faced by Sister Benedetta as a result of her alleged actions. It is considered a notable work in the field of lesbian history and gender studies, and provides insights into the experiences of women and sexual minorities in early modern Europe.

"Immodest Acts" is a story about Benedetta Carlini, a nun living in 17th-century Tuscany. She was elected as the abbess due to the notoriety she gained from visions of Jesus. At first, church authorities were skeptical of her visions but eventually embraced them for the prestige it would bring the convent. In 1619, Benedetta had a vision where Jesus commanded her to conduct a "grand wedding ceremony" during which she was to be his bride. This caused unease with church authorities; this resulted in two investigations to determine if her visions were divine or demonic. The author explores the suspicions of the authorities that she was involved in sexual acts with another nun.

Structure
The book is divided into chapters that cover different aspects of Sister Benedetta Carlini's life and the major events of her life.

The opening provides an overview of the cultural, social, and religious context of Renaissance Italy and sets the stage for the story of Sister Benedetta. The subsequent chapters examine the events leading up to Sister Benedetta's accusation of lesbianism, her trial, and the subsequent events in her life. The book also includes a detailed analysis of the written records of the case, including depositions, letters, and court documents.

Throughout the book, the author interweaves historical and cultural analysis with her interpretation of the events. The book concludes with a discussion of the broader implications of the case and its significance for the history of sexuality and gender.

Reviews

Citation

About the author
 
Judith C. Brown is an American historian and professor. They focuses on the history of early modern Europe, particularly the history of women and gender in Italy. Their research has contributed to the understanding of women's social, cultural, and religious experiences in early modern Europe.

See also
 Lesbian Nuns: Breaking Silence

References

Notes

Citations

External links
 Official page, Oxford University
 

History books
Gender studies books